Established in 1974, East Doncaster Secondary College (EDSC) is a government high school located in East Doncaster, approximately 20 kilometres east of Melbourne.

East Doncaster Secondary College is a co-educational school and has over 1500 students. The college offers a broad education from Years 7 to 12 and has a strong multicultural background, with over 40 nationalities represented.
East Doncaster Secondary College also provides an advanced program, ALPHA (Advanced Learning Program for High Achievers). Students taking part in this program study one year ahead of others, until the end of Year 9.

Notable alumni 
Paul Barclay, ABC Radio broadcaster
Ryan Corr, actor
Doug Hilton, molecular biologist
Isaac Quaynor, AFL player

See also 
List of high schools in Melbourne
List of high schools in Victoria
Victorian Certificate of Education

References

External links 
East Doncaster Secondary College website

Public high schools in Melbourne
Educational institutions established in 1974
1974 establishments in Australia
Buildings and structures in the City of Manningham